The 2017–18 season was the 84th season in Associazione Calcio Milan's history and their 82nd in the top-flight of Italian football. Milan competed in Serie A, UEFA Europa League and in the Coppa Italia. For the first time since the 2013–14 season, A.C. Milan competed in European competition, entering in the third qualifying round of the Europa League.

Players

Squad information

Transfers

Summer window

In

On loan

Loan returns

Total spending : €188.65M + (bonuses, option & obligation to buy) €60.15M = €248.80M

Out

Loans ended

Out on loan

Total income : €31.35M + (bonuses, option & obligation to buy) €46.80M = €78.15M

Winter window

In

Total spending : Undisclosed

Out

Out on loan

Total income : €3.40M + (obligation to buy) €0.30M = €3.70M

Pre-season

Friendlies

International Champions Cup

Competitions

Serie A

League table

Results summary

Results by round

Matches

Coppa Italia

UEFA Europa League

Third qualifying round

Play-off round

Group stage

Knockout phase

Round of 32

Round of 16

Statistics

Appearances and goals

|-
! colspan=14 style="text-align:center"|Goalkeepers

|-
! colspan=14 style="text-align:center"|Defenders

|-
! colspan=14 style="text-align:center"|Midfielders

|-
! colspan=14 style="text-align:center"|Forwards

|-
! colspan=14 style="text-align:center"|Other

|-
! colspan=14 style="text-align:center"|Players transferred out during the season

Goalscorers

Last updated: 20 May 2018

Clean sheets

Last updated: 20 May 2018

Disciplinary record

References

A.C. Milan seasons
Milan
Milan